William Collins  (8 September 1788 in London – 17 February 1847 in London) was an English landscape and genre painter. His sentimental paintings of poor people enjoying nature became a posthumous high fashion, notably in the 1870s when his market price rose higher than Constable (Cromer Sands, £3780, 1872) and stayed so until 1894. Turner, his model, far exceeded him in value (The Grand Canal, Venice, sold to Vanderbilt in 1885 for £20,000).

Life and work

Collins was born in Great Titchfield Street, London, son of William Collins Sr., an Irish-born picture-dealer and writer. He showed a great aptitude for art from an early age, and was for a while an informal pupil of George Morland. In 1807, he entered the schools of the Royal Academy (at the same time as William Etty), and exhibited at the Academy for the first time in the same year. In 1809 he was awarded a medal in the life school, and exhibited three pictures\: Boy at Breakfast, Boys with a Bird's-nest and a Portrait of Master Lee as he spoke the Prologue at the Haymarket Theatre.

In 1811, Collins sold a picture entitled The Young Fifer to the Marquis of Stafford for 80 guineas (£88), and the next year produced the work which made him famous, The Sale of the Pet Lamb, which was sold for 140 forty guineas (£154) and engraved by S. W. Reynolds. He now became the chief support of his family after the death of his father (in financial difficulty) and found some valuable patrons, especially Sir Thomas Freeman Heathcote, Sir John Leicester, Sir Robert Peel, Sir George Beaumont, and Lord Liverpool. In 1814 two pictures, The Blackberry Gatherers and The Birdcatchers (both sold privately) won him an associateship of the Royal Academy (ARA).

In 1815, Collins undertook a sketching tour of the coast near Cromer and produced a Scene on the Coast of Norfolk which was acquired by the Prince Regent.<ref>{{Cite web |url=http://www.royalcollection.org.uk/eGallery/object.asp?maker=13083&object=407233&row=0 |title=Scene on the Coast of Norfolk |publisher=Royal Collection}}</ref> In 1817 he visited Paris with Leslie and Washington Allston and painted The Departure of the Diligence from Rouen, and the Scene on the Boulevards (both sold privately) – these were exhibited at the Royal Academy in 1818. He also painted several portraits about this time.

In 1820, Collins was elected a Royal Academician (RA), presenting as his diploma picture The Young Anglers. In 1822 he married Harriet Geddes, sister of the portrait painter Margaret Sarah Carpenter. He continued to exhibit with popularity and travel in England and Scotland. In 1826 he painted The Fisherman's Departure, (engraved by Phelps), and in 1828 made a tour of the Netherlands and Belgium, living for short time in Boulogne in 1836. Rustic Hospitality was painted in 1834 and in 1836 Sunday Morning and As Happy as a King, the subject of the latter being suggested to Collins by the story of a country boy whose ideal of regal happiness was swinging on a gate all day and eating fat bacon.

In September 1836, Collins left London for Italy, where he remained for two years, occupying himself with advancing his knowledge of painting, but he had to return due to illness. He then began a series of pictures depicting Italian life, including Poor Travellers at the door of a Capuchin Convent near Vico, Bay of Naples and A Scene near Subiaco, both exhibited at the Royal Academy in 1839. They were followed in 1840–1841 by two New Testament subjects: Our Saviour with the Doctors in the Temple, and The Two Disciples at Emmaus.

From 1840 to 1842 Collins was librarian to the Royal Academy and in 1843 moved to a large house at 1 Devonport Street, Hyde Park Gardens. In 1840 he visited Germany and in 1842 the Shetland Islands, the latter inspiring a series of illustrations for Sir Walter Scott's novel Pirate, which appeared in the "Waverley" edition of the book.

In 1846 Collins's Early Morning was exhibited. Ruskin commented, "I have never seen the oppression of sunlight in a clear, lurid, rainy atmosphere more perfectly or faithfully rendered, and the various portions of reflected and scattered light are all studied with equal truth and solemn feeling." Collins also produced some watercolours such as The Rat-catcher, Landing Fish, A Street in Naples and Kentish Peasant Girls, and did several etchings, most of which were given to the British Museum by Mrs. Collins, along with engravings of his best works.

Death

Collins died of heart disease, "terminating in dropsy", in Devonport Street on 17 February 1847. He was buried in the cemetery of the church of St. Mary, Paddington, where a monument in the form of a Cross was erected by his widow. The grave now stands isolated, on the north side of St Marys Gardens, after the churchyard's conversion into a public park in 1881. It has been vandalised and the marble cross is missing; the inscription is also eroding.

He left two sons, the elder being William Wilkie Collins the novelist, named after his godfather, who wrote a biography of his father entitled "Memoirs of the Life of William Collins, Esq., R.A." (1848), and the youngest Charles Allston Collins, also a painter. In 1850, three years after Collins died, his widow Harriet and their sons, moved to 17 Hanover Terrace, Regent's Park next door to Collins's former patron and friend John Gibbons (1777–1851) at No. 16, and later in 1856, when Collins widow Harriet gave up No. 17, she moved next door to stay with Gibbons's widow Elizabeth Steen.

Works
Collins exhibited at the Royal Academy every year from 1807 to 1846 (a total of 124 pictures) and showed 45 pictures at the British Institution. His major works are listed in Volume 2 (pp. 341–352) of "Memoirs" (see Bibliography).

Today his works appear in the collections at the Victoria and Albert Museum and Tate Britain in London and at other regional centres.

Notes

Bibliography

Wilkie Collins, Memoirs of the life of William Collins, Esq., R. A'': Volume 1, Volume 2 (London: Longman, Brown, Green and Longmans, 1848)

External links

W. Collins online (ArtCyclopedia)
W. Collins biography and works
Returning from the Haunts of the Seafowl (Walker Art Gallery)
W. Collins archive (Royal Academy Collection)
Scene from the Caves of Ulysses, at Sorrento (1841, oil on canvas)
Hall Sands, Devo (1846, oil on canvas - V & A)
A country kitchen (1811, oil on canvas - V & A)

19th-century English painters
English male painters
English landscape painters
British genre painters
English watercolourists
English etchers
Royal Academicians
1788 births
1847 deaths
19th-century English male artists